Konyukhovo is a rural locality (a village) in Vologodsky District, Vologda Oblast, Russia. It is located on Losta River.
The population was 0 as of 2002 and 2010.

Geography 
The distance to Vologda is 21 km, 8 km to Ogarkovo. The nearest rural localities are Kishkintso, Nevinnikovo, Snasudovo and Yuryevtsevo.

References 

Rural localities in Vologodsky District